Tapishar Sher Singh (born 1949) is a former lawyer who was disbarred in 2007 by the Law Society of Upper Canada. 
He was one of eight recipients of the Order of Canada who had their honour revoked by the Order's Advisory Council.

Early years

Singh was born in Patna, Dominion of India in 1949 to Ishar Singh and Mahinder Kaur. He grew up in Patna and graduated with a BA (and incomplete MA degree) before arriving in Canada in 1971 and then went to Lakehead University. After years working a various jobs, Singh studied and applied for law school and completed his Ontario bar exams to practise as a litigation lawyer in Guelph, Ontario.

Legal problems

His professional misconduct, including the misappropriation of funds and continuing to practise after being suspended, caused Singh to be removed from the Order of Canada on 10 December 2008. He is also barred from practising as a lawyer in the province of Ontario.

See also

 Removal from the Order of Canada

References

1949 births
Canadian Sikhs
Canadian lawyers
Disbarred lawyers
Indian emigrants to Canada
People removed from the Order of Canada
People stripped of a British Commonwealth honour
Living people
People from Patna